David McMillan may refer to:
David McMillan (footballer) (born 1988), Irish football (soccer) player
David McMillan (American football) (1981–2013), American football player
David McMillan (smuggler) (born 1956), former independent drug smuggler
David McMillan (politician) (1836–1904), New Zealand politician
Dave McMillan (born 1944), New Zealand former racing driver
David McMillan, Canadian chef at the restaurant Joe Beef

See also
Dave MacMillan (1886–1963), American basketball coach
David MacMillan (born 1968), Scottish chemist and Nobel Prize Laureate 
David Macmillan (born 1935), Scottish actor
David MacMillan (sound engineer), American sound engineer and three-time Oscar winner